The first season of the Japanese animated television series Laid-Back Camp, based on the manga of the same name, follows Rin Shima in her solo camping trip by Lake Motosu in Yamanashi Prefecture and her first meeting with Nadeshiko Kagamihara afterward. Animated by C-Station, the season was directed by Yoshiaki Kyogoku from a series composition supervised by Jin Tanaka.

The season stars Yumiri Hanamori, Nao Tōyama, Sayuri Hara, Aki Toyosaki, Rie Takahashi, and Marina Inoue, with Akio Otsuka serving as the narrator. In January 2017, a TV adaptation of the manga series by Afro was announced. Kyogoku and Tanaka joined the staff in June 2017.

The first season aired in Japan from January 4 to March 22, 2018, and consists of twelve episodes. It received critical acclaim among critics and fans and inspired others to try camping. It is followed by a second season, which began airing in Japan on January 7, 2021.

Episodes

Cast and characters

Production

Development
Producer Shōichi Hotta initially proposed an anime adaptation of Laid-Back Camp manga series by Afro shortly after it began serialization in the July 2015 issue of Manga Time Kirara Forward magazine. The adaptation was confirmed in January 2017. In June 2017, the staff animating the season at C-Station were announced, including Yoshiaki Kyogoku as the director, Jin Tanaka as the head of the series composition, and Mutsumi Sasaki as the character animation designer. Kyogoku was introduced by Ryoji Maru, animation producer and the president of the studio, to the producer of the season due to his "good compatibility" with it, earning him his directorial debut. The premiere date of the season was announced to be on January 4, 2018.

Writing
Laid-Back Camp adapted the first four volumes of the manga series. Hotta laid out three themes—focus on fun camping, create a new kind of daily life anime, and feature beautiful places that are still in Japan—beforehand for the season, while also had set two things that needed to forbid—"When a character praises another one of the other girls, don't make them say 'You're cute'" and "Don't let them get touchy-feely so easily"—to portray "raw human relationships" between characters. To depict the camping experience in the season, the staff went on scouting trips to 10 different locations that the characters would be visiting and experienced camping during the winter.

Casting
In June 2017, Yumiri Hanamori and Nao Tōyama were announced as Nadeshiko Kagamihara and Rin Shima, respectively, as the main cast of Laid-Back Camp. Kyogoku found Hanamori's "fresh" and "ticklish" voice suitable for the character's "innocent" and "energetic" image. Sayuri Hara, Aki Toyosaki, and Rie Takahashi joined the cast in August 2017 as Chiaki Ōgaki, Aoi Inuyama, and Ena Saitō, respectively. Marina Inoue and Akio Otsuka also joined in December 2017 as Sakura Kagamihara and the narrator, respectively. The owner of Suimeiso campsite depicted in the sixth and seventh episodes of the season was modeled after the real-life owner Kitajima Shinsuke. The English dub cast for the season was announced in August 2022, including Morgan Garrett as Nadeshiko, Celeste Perez as Rin, Hannah Alyea as Aoi, Katelyn Barr as Chiaki, Molly Zhang as Ena, and Robin Clayton as Sakura.

Design
Rin Shima's moped depicted in the season was modeled after the Yamaha Vino scooter, while the camping tools were based on Afro's personal equipment.

Music

Akiyuki Tateyama served as the composer of Laid-Back Camp. In November 2017, Asaka was announced as the singer of the opening theme music titled "Shiny Days", while Eri Sasaki would be performing the ending theme music titled , with both singles released on January 24, 2018.

Marketing
The first trailer for Laid-Back Camp was released in November 2017, followed by the second trailer in December. An advanced screening followed by a talk show event with the cast was held at Toho Cinemas in Shinjuku on December 10, 2017.

Release

Broadcast
Laid-Back Camp began airing in Japan on AT-X and Tokyo MX on January 4, 2018, and on Sun TV, KBS Kyoto, and BS11 on January 5. The season began reairing on BS11 on October 8, 2021. In anticipation of the release of Laid-Back Camp Movie, the season began reairing on Tokyo MX and BS11 on January 6, 2022, on TV Aichi on January 7, on SBS on January 12, on TVQ Kyushu on January 13, and on MBS TV on January 14.

Home media
Crunchyroll simulcast Laid-Back Camp worldwide, excluding Asia. Ani-One began streaming the season on their official YouTube channel on December 24, 2020. In November 2022, the season became available to view on Amazon Prime Video in Japan.

The first volume of Blu-ray and DVD for the season was released in Japan on March 28, 2018, which contains an original video animation (OVA) titled Room Camp Episode 0. The second volume was released on May 23, 2018, which contains the second OVA titled Tall Tale Camp. The third and final volume was released on July 28, 2018, which contains the third OVA titled Survival Camp. The three volumes also contain a six-episode camping program starring Yumiri titled .

Reception

Critical response
Stig Høgset of THEM Anime Reviews rated Laid-Back Camp a complete 5 stars, lauding the series for its "leisurely pace to its fun characters and silly banter, and certainly not least the lovely scenery" and describing it as "Encouragement of Climb season 2.5". Nick Creamer of Anime News Network graded the season "B+", stating that it managed to deliver a "terrific balance of comedy and atmospheric slice of life" and bring the "joy of camping to life" while criticizing some episodes that depicted "less visually compelling" scenes. Rafael Motamayor of /Film praised the season for its beautiful backgrounds and the pacing that would "sell you on the idea of camping", comparing its depiction of Japan's outdoors to how The Lord of the Rings explored the sceneries of New Zealand. IGN listed the season as one of the best anime of the decade.

Accolades

|-
! scope="row" rowspan=3 | 2019
| rowspan=2 | Crunchyroll Anime Awards
| Best Girl
| Nadeshiko Kagamihara
| 
| rowspan=2 | 
|-
| Best Voice Actor Performance (Japanese)
| Nao Tōyama
| 
|-
| Tokyo Anime Awards Festival
| Individual Award for Directors
| Yoshiaki Kyogoku
| 
|

Impact
In February 2018, YBS Wide News reported that due to the influence of Laid-Back Camp, fans were inspired to try winter camping despite the chilly season, and all of the manga's first five volumes, excluding the fourth volume, were sold out at a bookstore in Kōfu. In the same month, dealers of Yamaha Vino also reported a sold-out sale of the scooters designed with the colors of Rin's scooter. Yamanashi Prefecture had seen a significant increase in the number of tourists visiting the sites that are featured in the season, particularly the Kōan and Suimeiso campgrounds.

Atsushi Tanaka, a tourism professor at the University of Yamanashi, and the Jogaoka Revitalization Promotion Council in Minobu surveyed the economic impact of Laid-Back Camp on Yamanashi. The five events for the season, which were held from April 2018 to January 2019, brought in million in total earnings from the consumption of local goods and souvenirs, with visitors spending 40% more than the tourism average in the past. The increase on spending was attributed to the "psychological effect" of the season to fans wanting to spend money on the featured locations.

Original video animations
The first OVA for Laid-Back Camp was released on YouTube for a limited time from December 12, 2019, to January 6, 2020. All of the three OVAs aired on AT-X in May 2020. The three OVAs aired collectively as "Episode 13" in Japan on Tokyo MX and BS11 on March 31, 2022, on TV Aichi and TVQ Kyushu on April 1, on MBS on April 2, and on SBS on April 6.

Note

References

External links
  
 

2018 anime television series debuts
Anime series based on manga
C-Station
Camping in anime and manga
Medialink
Slice of life anime and manga
TV Tokyo original programming